Kobi is a given name. Notable people with the name include:

 Kobi Alexander (born 1952), American businessman, founder of Comverse Technology
 Kobi Baladev (born 1965), Israeli footballer
 Kobi Dajani (born 1984), Israeli footballer
 Kobi Hassan (born 1978), Israeli footballer
 Kobi Karp (born 1962), American architect
 Köbi Kuhn (born 1943), Swiss footballer
 Kobi Lichtenstein (born 1964), Israeli master of krav maga
 Kobi Metzer, Israeli economic historian
 Kobi Moyal (born 1987), Israeli footballer
 Kobi Nachtailer (born 1978), Israeli footballer
 Kobi Oshrat (born 1944), Israeli composer and conductor
 Kobi Oz (born 1969), lead singer of the Israeli group Teapacks
 Kobi Peretz (born 1975), Israeli singer
 Kobi Refua (born 1974), Israeli footballer

See also
 Kobe (disambiguation)